Ornativalva macrosignella is a moth of the family Gelechiidae. It was described by Sattler in 1967. It is found in Algeria, Tunisia, Egypt, Sudan, Israel and southern Iran (Luristan).

Adults have been recorded on wing from February to July.

The larvae feed on Tamarix tetragyna and Tamarix nilotica.

References

Moths described in 1967
Ornativalva